The Venerable John Priaulx, D.D. was an Anglican priest in England during the  17th century.

Priaulx was educated at Merton College, Oxford. He held the livings at Fovant, Long Newnton and Berwick St John, all (at that time) in Wiltshire. He was Archdeacon of Sarum from 1671 until his death on 2 June 1674.

Notes 

Alumni of Merton College, Oxford
1674 deaths
Archdeacons of Sarum
Clergy from Shropshire
17th-century English Anglican priests